The Peloponnese slowworm (Anguis cephalonnica) is a species of lizard in the family Anguidae endemic to Greece.  Its natural habitats are temperate forests, temperate shrubland, Mediterranean-type shrubby vegetation, temperate grassland, arable land, pastureland, plantations, and rural gardens.

References

Anguis
Reptiles described in 1894
Lizards of Europe
Endemic fauna of Greece
Taxa named by Franz Werner
Taxonomy articles created by Polbot
Taxobox binomials not recognized by IUCN